The notion of pushforward in mathematics is "dual" to the notion of pullback, and can mean a number of different but closely related things.

 Pushforward (differential), the differential of a smooth map between manifolds, and the "pushforward" operations it defines
 Pushforward (homology), the map induced in homology by a continuous map between topological spaces
 Pushforward measure, measure induced on the target measure space by a measurable function
 Pushout (category theory), the categorical dual of pullback
 Direct image sheaf, the pushforward of a sheaf by a map
 Fiberwise integral, the direct image of a differential form or cohomology by a smooth map, defined by "integration on the fibres"
 Transfer operator, the pushforward on the space of measurable functions; its adjoint, the pull-back, is the composition or Koopman operator

zh:推出